Usman Tariq Chaudhry (born December 28, 1983) in Bahawalpur, Punjab is a Pakistani first-class cricketer.

A left-handed top order batsman, Tariq made his List A debut in 1996/97 when he was just 13. He has since become one of the most experienced players on the domestic cricket scene in Pakistan having played his 100th first-class game in the 2006/07 season. In the same season he scored 114 off just 65 balls in a one-day game against Abbottabad. Usman has also scored 3 double hundreds, also scored each innings ton against PIA.

His brother, Hammad Tariq and father Tariq Abdullah both also played first-class cricket in Pakistan for Bahawalpur.

References

1983 births
Living people
Pakistani cricketers
Bahawalpur cricketers
Allied Bank Limited cricketers
Multan cricketers
Pakistan International Airlines cricketers
Port Qasim Authority cricketers
Baluchistan cricketers
Pakistan Telecommunication Company Limited cricketers
Cricketers from Bahawalpur